Kabirpur is a village in Gosainganj block of Lucknow district, Uttar Pradesh, India. As of 2011, its population is 1,566, in 319 households. It is the seat of a gram panchayat, which also includes the village of Muazzamnagar.

References 

Villages in Lucknow district